Ioffe is a Jewish surname. Notable people with the surname include:
Abram Ioffe (1880–1960), Russian/Soviet physicist
Dmitry Ioffe (1963 -  2020), Israeli mathematician
Julia Ioffe (born 1982), Russian-born American journalist
Mikhail Ioffe (1917–1996), Soviet/Russian physicist
Nelli Ioffe (born 2004), Russian-Israeli figure skater

See also

Jaffe family
Joffe
Jaffe
Yoffe
Yaffe

Jewish surnames
Hebrew-language surnames
Yiddish-language surnames